Chisanbop or chisenbop (from Korean chi (ji) finger + sanpŏp (sanbeop) calculation  지산법/指算法), sometimes called Fingermath, is an abacus-like finger counting method used to perform basic mathematical operations.  According to The Complete Book of Chisanbop 
by Hang Young Pai, chisanbop was created in the 1940s in Korea by Sung Jin Pai and revised by his son Hang Young Pai, who brought the system to the United States in 1977.

With the chisanbop method it is possible to display all numbers from 0 to 99 on two hands, and to perform the addition, subtraction, multiplication and division of numbers. The system has been described as being easier to use than a physical abacus for students with visual impairments.

Basic concepts 

Each finger (but not the thumb) of the right hand has a value of one. Holding both hands above the table, press the index finger of the right hand onto the table to indicate "one". Press the index and middle fingers for "two", the three leftmost fingers for "three", and all four fingers of the right hand to indicate "four". 

The thumb of the right hand indicates the value "five". For "six", press the right thumb and index finger onto the table. Thumb plus one finger indicates "five plus one", and 5+1=6.

The left hand represents the tens digit. It works like the right hand, but each value is multiplied by ten. Each finger on the left hand represents "ten", and the left thumb represents "fifty". In this way, all values between zero and ninety-nine can be indicated on two hands.

Adoption in the United States

A school in Shawnee Mission, Kansas, ran a pilot program with students in 1979. It was found that although they could add large numbers quickly, they could not add them in their heads. The program was dropped. Grace Burton of the University of North Carolina said, "It doesn't teach the basic number facts, only to count faster. Adding and subtracting quickly are only a small part of mathematics."

See also
Finger binary
 bi-quinary coded decimal

References

Further reading

External links 
Interactive demonstration of Chisenbop
Instructable: How to count higher than 10 on your fingers, step 3: Chisenbop

Abacus
Finger-counting